Argyll Campbell (December 2, 1882 – November 24, 1943) was city attorney for Carmel-by-the-Sea, California from 1920 to 1937. He was former chairman of the California Democratic Party to elect governor Culbert Olson. Campbell was a leader in Monterey Peninsula civic life for twenty-eight years. He was known for his efforts to "keep Carmel from radical change."

Early life

Campbell was born on December 2, 1882, in San Jose, California. His parents were attorney James Havelock Campbell (1849-1923) and Mary Ann J. Faulkner (1858-1908). He went to Santa Clara University and attended Northwestern University, but did not graduate. He married Mabel Marie Phelps (1880-1962) on July 8, 1909 in the chapel of Santa Clara college in Santa Clara, California.

Career

Theater
Shortly after coming to Carmel, Campbell became involved with the Carmel Arts and Crafts Club and Forest Theater. On June 30, 1915, he wrote a column in the Monterey Daily Cypress and Monterey American, about the production of the four-act play, Junipero Serra, A Pageant of the Padres, at the Forest Theater from July 2-3, 5, 1915. He wrote about Perry Newberry as the director and producer of the play. They became good friends at the Forest Theater. Campbell was the director of dancing.

On April 16, 1919, he was in the play, A Night Off. Campbell played Justinian Babbitt, Professor of Ancient History, under the direction of Mary E. Hand.

City attorney
He passed the California Bar Examination and opened a law office in San Jose. During World War I he joined the army, serving as a military law instructor at the Santa Clara University and at the Presidio of San Francisco. He became a major in the United States Army Adjutant General's Corps department.

He was district attorney of San Jose before coming to Carmel in 1914. When he came to Carmel with his wife, his first impression of Carmel was a "bay as blue as that of Naples and an altogether impossible sunset."

Campbell served as city attorney of Carmel-by-the-Sea for fifteen years, from 1920 to 1937. He served as city attorney for Pacific Grove, California and Soledad, California and as deputy district attorney of Monterey County, California. He was responsible for drawing up many of Carmel's first zoning laws and ordinances. He is best remembered for writing Carmel’s "Magna Carta," ordinance  No. 96 on June 5, 1929, which said:

Campbell backed the ordinance with zoning ordinances that limited the business district and restricting the size of residential houses and lots. No sidewalks in the residential area, no streetlights, no commercial development on the beach, preservation of the native trees, one or two stories height limitation, and no billboards. These ordinances have helped preserve Carmel's character as a village.

Campbell shared the same philosophy as Newberry, who became the fifth mayor of Carmel in 1922 and was the editor of the Carmel Pine Cone. They were both known for their efforts to prevent the town from becoming "another Santa Cruz," with beach amusements and commercial tourist attractions. Campbell even suggested "building a wall around the town and restricting entry," much like the neighboring community of Pebble Beach, California.

In 1937, the city abolished the position of city attorney, thereby discharging Campbell from a position he had since 1920. Campbell's son, Gordon Campbell (1910-1995), a graduate from Stanford's law school, took on a position as city councilmen. He later became a Monterey County Superior Court judge and lawyer.

He was active in the affairs of Carmel's American Legion Post No. 512.

Death

Campbell, at age 60, died on November 24, 1943, from heart failure, at his home in Carmel-by-the-Sea, California. Private funeral services were held in Pacific Grove. Interment was at the Monterey City cemetery.

References

External links

 

1882 births
1943 deaths
20th-century American lawyers
People from Carmel-by-the-Sea, California
California Democrats